Kevin Perera (born 20 April 2000) is a Sri Lankan cricketer. He made his Twenty20 debut on 8 January 2020, for Lankan Cricket Club in the 2019–20 SLC Twenty20 Tournament. He made his first-class debut for Lankan Cricket Club in the 2019–20 Premier League Tournament on 16 August 2020. He made his List A debut on 1 April 2021, for Lankan Cricket Club in the 2020–21 Major Clubs Limited Over Tournament.

References

External links
 

2000 births
Living people
Sri Lankan cricketers
Lankan Cricket Club cricketers
Place of birth missing (living people)